Acar is a village in the Kilis District, Kilis Province, Turkey. The village had a population of 448 in 2022.

In late 19th century, German orientalist Martin Hartmann listed the village as a settlement of 40 houses inhabited by Turks.

References

Villages in Kilis District